The Rohrer House, also known as Silsby House, is a historic home located at Hagerstown, Washington County, Maryland, United States. It is a three-bay, two-story brick dwelling, with a two bay frame rear wing, painted white with black trim. The house is set on fieldstone foundations and was built about 1790.

The Rohrer House was listed on the National Register of Historic Places in 1979.

References

External links
, including photo from 1974, at Maryland Historical Trust

Houses on the National Register of Historic Places in Maryland
Houses in Hagerstown, Maryland
Houses completed in 1790
National Register of Historic Places in Washington County, Maryland